Gubernatorial elections in 1993 took place in twelve regions of the Russian Federation.

Race summary 

Following the escalation of 1993 Russian constitutional crisis the governors had to choose whether to support the parliament or the president. Those who chose the losing side, were later removed from office by the president. Among them were governors of Amur and Bryansk Oblasts Aleksandr Surat and Yury Lodkin, both serving only six months.

Ingushetia 

On 28 February 1993, presidential election was held in Ingushetia. Major General Ruslan Aushev, formerly head of provisional administration of Ingushetia, ran unopposed. He was sworn in as president on 7 March 1993. A snap election was held a year after, along with the constitutional referendum and election of the People's Assembly.

Kalmykia 

Presidential election in the Republic of Kalmykia was held on Sunday, 11 April 1993, 17 months after the previous voting of 1991, which did not reveal the winner. People's deputy of Russia Kirsan Ilyumzhinov won the presidency, defeating General Valery Ochirov (29.22%) and president of the Farmers Association of Kalmykia Vladimir Bambayev (1.55%). At age of 31, Ilyumzhinov became the youngest holder of governor-level office in Russia.

References

Sources

Gubernatorial elections in Russia
1993 elections in Russia